Tino Sorge (born 4 March 1975) is a German lawyer and politician of the Christian Democratic Union (CDU) who has been serving as a member of the Bundestag from the state of Saxony-Anhalt since 2013.

Political career 
Sorge first became a member of the Bundestag in the 2013 German federal election, representing the Magdeburg district. He is a member of the Health Committee. Since the 2021 elections, Sorge has been serving as his parliamentary group’s spokesperson for health policy.

In addition to his committee assignments, Sorge is part of the der German-American Parliamentary Friendship Group, the German-Chinese Parliamentary Friendship Group, and the German-Russian Parliamentary Friendship Group.

Political positions
In June 2017, Sorge voted against his parliamentary group's majority and in favor of Germany's introduction of same-sex marriage.

Ahead of the Christian Democrats’ leadership election, Sorge publicly endorsed in 2020 Jens Spahn to succeed Annegret Kramp-Karrenbauer as the party's chair.

Controversy 
In 2022, German tabloid Bild reported Sorge was absent from parliament on several session days in September 2020 and attended an intensive course at a hunting school during this time.

References

External links 

  
 Bundestag biography 

1975 births
Living people
Members of the Bundestag for Saxony-Anhalt
Members of the Bundestag 2021–2025
Members of the Bundestag 2017–2021
Members of the Bundestag 2013–2017
People from Ilmenau
Members of the Bundestag for the Christian Democratic Union of Germany